Alex Neri (born in Sarzana, Italy, on June 16, 1970) is an Italian DJ, producer and songwriter.

Biography
A founding member of Planet Funk, having formed the band in the late 90s, Alex Neri also pursued a solo career and established an independent record label named Tenax Recordings.

He started his career playing at the Alhambra, a nightclub in Sarzana owned by his father. Neri began his studio activity collaborating with Marco Baroni and working on different productions such as the Korda project ('Move Your Body') and Kamasutra ('Storm In My Soul'), all while releasing remixed productions for artists such as Club Freaks, Annette Taylor, Future Force, Instant Funk and Jestofunk.

In 1998 Neri and Baroni launched their first single 'Happiness' featuring Jocelyn Brown, which reached 5th place on dance charts in the US and 45th place in the UK. At the same time, Alex Neri met and started collaborating with Gigi Canu and Sergio della Monica, which led to the establishment of Planet Funk.

Discography

Solo albums
 1992: The Wizard
 1993: Soave (with DJ Le Roy Feat. Bocachica)
 1995: Headphone (EP) 
 1995: Planet Funk 
 1996: Planet Funk 2 
 2004: Housetrack/Club Element
 2004: Aurora
 2006: April 
 2007: La Fotografia (with Luca Bacchetti)
 2008: Warm Vibes (EP) (with Marco Solforetti and Ilario Alicante)
 2014: Mystic Tattoo (with Marco Baroni)
 2015: Desert Rose (with Federico Grazzini)

Planet Funk
 2002: Non Zero Sumness
 2005: The Illogical Consequence
 2006: Static
 2009: Planet Funk
 2011: The Great Shake

References

External links

1970 births
Living people
Italian record producers
Italian songwriters
Male songwriters
Italian DJs
Electronic dance music DJs